Ruchanki is a flat, oval racuszki from bread dough (providing a light sour taste) or sponge cake (sweet taste), hot fried on fat. 

Formerly, ruchanki were produced from left over bread dough. The bread dough version was popularly eaten instead of bread for inter alia breakfast. Ruchanki baked from wheat flour and yeast were traditionally baked for carnivals. These are served hot, topped with powdered sugar or white sugar. In Kashubia these are served with apples. 

Ruchanki are enlisted on the list of traditional produce of the Pomeranian Voivodeship. The official list states, that the average diameter of ruchanki should be between 5 and 7 cm and their thickness at 0.5 cm.

See also
Pomeranian cuisine

References

Polish cuisine
Pomeranian cuisine
Kashubia
Pomerania